Mount Healy, also known in Denaʼina language as Dlel Neelghu Nodaadlghunee (meaning "mountains that are joined together"), is a 5,716-foot (1,742 meter) elevation mountain summit located in the Alaska Range, in Denali National Park and Preserve, in Alaska, United States. The George Parks Highway and Alaska Railroad traverse the eastern base of this mountain as each passes through the Nenana River Gorge. Mount Healy's nearest neighbor, Sugar Loaf Mountain, is set  to the east across the gorge, and the nearest higher peak is Fang Mountain,  to the south-southwest. Mount Healy is a nine-mile-long, east–west trending ridge system of mostly loose rock with jagged peaks and spires. Vegetation ranges from boreal forest at the base all the way up to barren alpine ridges and snowfields at the top. This area is very popular for day hikes due to its close proximity to the park entrance. This mountain and the town are named after John J. Healy (1840–1908), manager of the North American Trading and Transportation Company. This geographical feature's name was reported in 1921 by Mabry Abbey on his survey map of the boundaries of Mount McKinley National Park.

Climate
Based on the Köppen climate classification, Mount Healy is located in a subarctic climate zone with long, cold, snowy winters, and mild summers. Temperatures can drop below −20 °C with wind chill factors below −30 °C. The months May through June offer the most favorable weather for climbing or viewing. Precipitation runoff from the mountain drains into tributaries of the Nenana River, which in turn is part of the Tanana River drainage basin.

See also

List of mountain peaks of Alaska
Geology of Alaska

Gallery

References

External links
 Weather forecast: Mount Healy 
 Weather forecast: National Weather Service
 Denali National Park & Preserve - National Park Service site

Healy
Healy
Healy
Healy
Healy
North American 1000 m summits
Denaʼina